Naomi Kahoilua Wilson (born July 5, 1949) is an American actress known for the only role she ever played, that of "Mahana" in the film Johnny Lingo.

Kahoilua was born and raised in Hilo, Hawaii, graduating from Hilo High School.  She is a Latter-day Saint.  While attending the Church College of Hawaii (now Brigham Young University-Hawaii) she acted in the role of "Mahana" in "Johnny Lingo".  Since that time she has been identified with that role and has given talks at firesides about this role at least once a year.  Also in 1967 Kahoilua was "Miss Church College of Hawaii".  An image of her face was also used on Hawaiian Airlines planes.

In 1970 Naomi Kahoilua married (Marion) Brent Wilson.  They moved to Spokane, Washington in 1975 where they still resided in March 2010.  Wilson is a piano instructor who teaches children prior to entering college and prepares them for board tryouts.  Naomi and Brent are the parents of three children.

References

External links 
 
 
 Mormon Times, March 3, 2010
 Paul Skousen. Brother Paul's Mormon Bathroon Reader. (Springville, Utah: Cedar Fort, Inc., 2005) p. 169.
 "Mahanas message reflects in life accomplishments of performer 30 years later", Church News, February 12, 2000.

1949 births
Latter Day Saints from Washington (state)
Brigham Young University–Hawaii alumni
Actresses from Spokane, Washington
Living people
American film actresses
People from Hilo, Hawaii
20th-century American actresses
Actresses from Hawaii
Latter Day Saints from Hawaii